John Reccius (October 29, 1859 – September 1, 1930) was an American outfielder in Major League Baseball. Born in Louisville, Kentucky, he played for the Louisville Eclipse of the American Association in 1882 and 1883.

Reccius had two brothers who were also involved in baseball. Phil Reccius was a major league player for eight seasons, mostly with Louisville, and Bill Reccius was the founder and manager for the mid-1870s version of the Louisville Eclipse, though he did not manage or play when the team was in the majors. John and his brothers were childhood friends of Pete Browning and Jimmy Wolf, as well as others from the area who reached the major leagues.

Reccius died in Louisville, Kentucky, at the age of 70 and was interred at Cave Hill Cemetery.

References

External links

1859 births
1930 deaths
19th-century baseball players
Major League Baseball outfielders
Louisville Eclipse players
Harrisburg (minor league baseball) players
Harrisburg Olympics players
Trenton Trentonians players
Jersey City Jerseys players
Terre Haute (minor league baseball) players
Marinette Badgers players
Baseball players from Louisville, Kentucky
Burials at Cave Hill Cemetery